Fergal Harkin is a former League of Ireland footballer and "Football Partnerships and Pathways Manager" for Manchester City F.C. He is from Ballyliffin in Inishowen, County Donegal in Ireland.

Harkin started his amateur football career with his local club Clonmany Shamrocks, who play in the Inishowen Football League. He then signed for Leicester City F.C. while a student at Loughborough University. He was later released and joined Bohemian F.C. for the 1998/1999 season, however moved to Finn Harps F.C. later that season. He appeared in that season's FAI Cup final for Finn Harps but was on the losing side to Bray Wanderers. He was Finn Harps player of the year in the 1999/2000 season.

Harkin re-joined Bohemians in June 2001 and won the first major honour when he played his part in Bohemian's league win of 2002/2003. He was voted "player of the year" at Bohemians in both 2005 and 2006. He retired at the end of the 2007 season due to injury.

Harkin has a degree in Physical Education and Sports Science at Loughborough University and a Masters in Business Studies from University College Dublin. After retiring from football, he worked for Nike for 6 years. Since 2009 he has been working for Manchester City Football Club as first a scout and now "Football Partnerships and Pathways Manager".

On 17 May 2022, Standard de Liège hired Harkin as its new manager in charge of deploying the sport strategy of the club in the long term. Harkin was the first significant lateral hire of Standard de Liège after the arrival of 777 Partners as new majority shareholder.

References

Manchester City F.C. non-playing staff
Loughborough University athletes
Association footballers from County Donegal
Year of birth missing (living people)
Living people
Association football midfielders
Republic of Ireland association footballers
Bohemian F.C. players
Finn Harps F.C. players